Let's Swing! is an album by saxophonist Budd Johnson which was recorded in 1960 and released on the Swingville label.

Reception

The contemporaneous DownBeat reviewer praised the playing of both Johnsons, but commented that there was little of interest in the musical arrangements used. Scott Yanow of AllMusic states, "One of tenor saxophonist Budd Johnson's best showcases, Let's Swing! finds him featured in a quintet ... Throughout, Johnson sounds both modern, as if he had come of age as one of the "cool school," and timeless, since he was a major player by the mid-'30s. A fine set".

Track listing
All compositions by Budd Johnson except where noted.
 "Serenade in Blue" (Harry Warren, Mack Gordon) – 3:39
 "I Only Have Eyes for You" (Warren, Al Dubin) – 4:30
 "Downtown Manhattan" – 7:50
 "Someone to Watch over Me" (George Gershwin, Ira Gershwin) – 4:47
 "Falling in Love with Love" (Richard Rodgers, Lorenz Hart) – 5:44
 "Blues by Budd" – 10:01
 "Uptown Manhattan" – 6:18

Personnel
Budd Johnson – tenor saxophone
Keg Johnson – trombone
Tommy Flanagan – piano
George Duvivier – bass
Charlie Persip – drums

References

Budd Johnson albums
1961 albums
Swingville Records albums
Albums produced by Esmond Edwards
Albums recorded at Van Gelder Studio